= Trischizostoma =

Scientific classification
- Domain: Eukaryota
- Kingdom: Animalia
- Phylum: Arthropoda
- Class: Malacostraca
- Order: Amphipoda
- Family: Trischizostomatidae
- Genus: Trischizostoma; Boeck, 1861

Family of crustaceans

Trischizostoma is a genus of crustaceans belonging to the monotypic family Trischizostomatidae.

The genus has almost cosmopolitan distribution.

Species:

- Trischizostoma barnardi G.Vinogradov, 1990
- Trischizostoma christochelatum G.Vinogradov, 1990
- Trischizostoma circulare J.L.Barnard, 1961
- Trischizostoma costai Freire & Serejo, 2004
- Trischizostoma cristochelata G.Vinogradov, 1990
- Trischizostoma crosnieri Lowry & Stoddart, 1993
- Trischizostoma denticulatum Ledoyer, 1978
- Trischizostoma longirostre Chevreux, 1919
- Trischizostoma longirostrum Chevreux, 1919
- Trischizostoma macrochela G.Vinogradov, 1990
- Trischizostoma nascaense G.Vinogradov, 1990
- Trischizostoma nicaeense (Costa, 1853)
- Trischizostoma paucispinosum K.H.Barnard, 1916
- Trischizostoma raschi Esmark & Boeck, 1861
- Trischizostoma remipes Stebbing, 1908
- Trischizostoma richeri Lowry & Stoddart, 1994
- Trischizostoma serratum K.H.Barnard, 1925
- Trischizostoma tanjae G.Vinogradov, 1990
- Trischizostoma tohokuense Tomikawa & Komatsu, 2009
- Trischizostoma unam Winfield, Hendrickx & Ortiz, 2017
